This is a list of all books in the Animorphs series by K. A. Applegate. For a list of authors who ghostwrote much of this series using Applegate's name, see .

Animorphs main series
There are fifty-four books in the main series.

Companion books

Chronological list
This is a chronological list of the Animorphs books by K. A. Applegate, as applies to storyline continuity.

The Andalite Chronicles
This book is divided into three parts: #1: Elfangor's Journey, #2: Alloran's Choice, and #3: An Alien Dies.
1: The Invasion (Spring 1997)
2: The Visitor
3: The Encounter
4: The Message
5: The Predator
6: The Capture
7: The Stranger
Megamorphs 1: The Andalite's Gift (Summer 1997)
8: The Alien
9: The Secret
10: The Android
11: The Forgotten
12: The Reaction
13: The Change
14: The Unknown
15: The Escape
16: The Warning
17: The Underground
18: The Decision—()
Megamorphs 2: In the Time of Dinosaurs—(Sario Rip time travel to 65,000,000 years ago.)
19: The Departure
The Hork-Bajir Chronicles (1966, 1968–69, 1998)
Although the events in this story occur between The Ellimist Chronicles and The Andalite Chronicles, the entire story is being told by Jara Hamee to Tobias after book #13, The Change, and before the events of #23 The Pretender. Tobias makes reference to his restlessness and the fact that there were no missions planned (Prologue, pg ix). However, in The Pretender, (pg 12) Tobias makes reference to the fact that they had "worked plenty lately, dealing with the horrifying matter of David, the first new Animorph." This places the last possible "break" before book #20, the first book in the David trilogy
20: The Discovery
21: The Threat
22: The Solution
23: The Pretender
24: The Suspicion
25: The Extreme
26: The Attack
27: The Exposed
28: The Experiment
29: The Sickness
Megamorphs 3: Elfangor's Secret (Time Matrix time travel to 10/25/1415, 12/25/1776, 10/21/1805, 1934, 6/6/1944, and 1967)
30: The Reunion—(sometime a little bit before or after 12/18/98)
31: The Conspiracy
32: The Separation—()
33: The Illusion
34: The Prophecy
35: The Proposal
Visser (1976, 1980s, 1991–1999)
The trial chronicled in Visser is set during and after the events of The Proposal, but the book also covers events before The Andalite Chronicles.
36: The Mutation
37: The Weakness
38: The Arrival
39: The Hidden
40: The Other
Megamorphs 4: Back to Before (1999, experimental timeline to 1997)
41: The Familiar
42: The Journey
43: The Test
44: The Unexpected
45: The Revelation
46: The Deception
47: The Resistance
48: The Return
49: The Diversion
50: The Ultimate
51: The Absolute
52: The Sacrifice
53: The Answer
The Ellimist Chronicles (story stretching billions of years into the past)
Technically this is set during the same time as the first chapters of The Beginning even though it covers events set far before The Andalite Chronicles.
54: The Beginning (2000-)

See also

References

Books
 
Lists of novels